Chromium telluride (Cr2Te3) is an inorganic chemical compound. It is composed of the chromium(III) cation and the telluride anion. It has a shadowy gray color, and has a hexagonal crystal structure.

Properties

Thermodynamic 
Chromium telluride samples that are highly saturated with tellurium were found to crystallize in a hexagonal structure, but trigonal lattice distortions are also possible.

Magnetic 
Chromium telluride is strongly paramagnetic, and it can be used in the construction of nanocrystals. In addition, the compound also shows ferromagnetic properties. By creating thin films of chromium telluride, the compound can be tested by reflection high-energy electron diffraction (RHEED), scanning tunneling microscopy (STM), vibrating sample magnetometry, and other physical property measurements. RHEED patterns indicate the flat, smooth growth of chromium telluride film. STM testing shows that the surface atoms of the compound arrange themselves in a hexagonal pattern. The Curie temperature was found to be 180 K When transitioning between paramagnetic and ferromagnetic forms of magnetism, the surrounding magnetic field collapse into two independent curves with a sole scaling equation. However, chromium telluride can still continue with a reversal of magnetism.

When being measured at room temperature, the anomalous Hall voltage of chromium telluride seems to consist of both negative anomalous and positive normal component. The negative anomalous component exhibits saturation against the intensity of the magnetic field, while the positive normal component can be ascribed to hole conduction. This is measured from room temperature to 400 °C with a-c sample current and d-c magnetic field.

References

Chromium(III) compounds
Tellurides